Miskolc City Centre is basically the historical part of the city of Miskolc, Hungary. Most of the other parts of the city were either independent towns and villages previously, or they were built later.

Many of the characteristic buildings of Miskolc can be found in the city centre, although the most famous ones, like the castle of Diósgyőr or the Cave Bath of Lillafüred are outside of it.

Széchenyi street

The most significant street of the city is the István Széchenyi street, which is a continuation of the Bajcsy-Zsilinszky street leading to Tiszai station. Széchenyi street runs through the Downtown and through most of the city from east to west. The part of the street between the Szinvapark shopping mall and City Hall Square was pedestrianized in the early 1980s, except for the Miskolc trams. This part is colloquially called "Main street". Most of the houses on both sides are from the late 19th century, built after the Great Flood, which destroyed most of the downtown.

Some regard Hungary Széchenyi street as the longest main street in Europe—but this is inaccurate, since Széchenyi street itself is only about 1 km long, and even in Miskolc several streets are many times longer. It is, however, one of nine streets that, as straight continuations of each other, form the longest (about 12 km) street of the city. These are (East to West): Bajcsy-Zsilinszky street – Széchenyi street – Hunyadi street – Tizeshonvéd street – Győri kapu – Andrássy street – General Ernő Kiss street – Árpád street – Hegyalja street. This long street runs nearly the length of the city, including the city centre and historical Diósgyőr, and is crossed by over 100 minor streets, but in common speech only Széchenyi street is called main street.

Significant buildings of the street include:

 Rákóczi house: a Baroque building that was headquarters to Francis II Rákóczi during the revolution in the early 18th century. Today it houses the Gallery of Miskolc. The Dark Gate, one of the old town gates is next to it.
 National Theatre of Miskolc: a neoclassical building constructed in 1857 in place of a previous one that burnt down. The International Opera Festival of Miskolc is organized here annually. The Theatre Museum can be found on Mrs Déry street, which connects Széchenyi street to Heroes Square.

 Villanyrendőr ("traffic signal", though literally meaning "electric policeman") is a name of the crossing where Széchenyi street meets Kazinczy street. It got this name because it was the first place in the city where traffic lights were installed. Since the main street had been pedestrianized, traffic is not as heavy here as it used to be.

Near Villanyrendőr and the Szinva stream, parallel to Széchenyi Street is the newest public square of the city, the Szinva Terrace.

The shopping quarter of the city is found in the vicinity.

City Hall Square and St. Stephen Square

City Hall Square is to the north of Széchenyi street, at its eastern end. The city hall (built in Romantic style) and the neoclassical county hall can be found here, along with a not really pretty Széchenyi statue.

St. Stephen Square is opposite to City Hall Square.

Elizabeth Square
Elizabeth Square (Erzsébet tér) is south from Széchenyi street. South from it is the Avas hill with the gothic Protestant church on it. The church is the oldest building of Miskolc proper (15th century). The carousel from the belfry next to the church can be heard even in City Hall Square.

The Elizabeth Bath, the first Kossuth statue of the country and a fountain can be found on this square too.

The oldest building of the Ottó Herman Museum is also not very far. It houses the mineral collection of the museum.

Deák square

Deák square is north from Széchenyi street and northwest from Heroes Square. Its famous buildings are the newly renovated building of the forestry office, the Gyula Feledy Gallery, a statue of József Lévay, and a Greek Orthodox church built between 1785 and 1806 with the largest iconostasis of Central Europe and the largest Greek Orthodox church museum of the country.

Heroes' Square

Heroes' Square (Hősök tere) is north from Széchenyi Street and Villanyrendőr. It has a monument dedicated to the heroes of the 1956 revolution (before the end of the Socialist era a monument of the Soviets stood on the square.) The square is bordered by 19th and early 20th century buildings: the Baroque Minorite church and the Ferenc Földes High School from north, the Postal Palace from east, the Synagogue of Miskolc from south (though its entrance is on Kazinczy street leading towards Széchenyi street) and the building of the Gergely Berzeviczy Secondary School from west.

The complete refashioning of the square started in the spring of 2006.

Mindszent (All Saints) square
The square is surrounded by three large buildings: the Mindszent Church, the International Trade Center (the Communist party headquarters before 1990), and the national health insurance company building. The Baroque style church, several centuries ago, was the church of a small village called Mindszent ("All Saints"), which the city has since absorbed. The Baroque statue, Mary with the jar can be found here too.

Búza tér (Wheat square)
Búza tér is one of the main traffic hubs of the city. It has the largest bus station of the city; several bus lines have their end station here, both city and country buses. The largest marketplace of Miskolc can be found here too.

Népkert
Népkert (literally: "People's Garden") is the largest public park in the Downtown (cca 57 000 m2). Its highlights include the restaurant Népkerti Vigadó, the statue park and the first Queen Elisabeth statue of the country. The city's sport hall and the country library are next to the Népkert. On the other side of the road—which is the western border of Népkert—are two important buildings: the Kós House and main building of the Ottó Herman Museum.

External links 

Official sites of the city and city parts
 Official website 
 Official website of Miskolc tourism 
 Official website of Miskolc tourist card 

Neighbourhoods of Miskolc